The Captain class was the designation given to 78 frigates of the Royal Navy, constructed in the United States, launched in 1942–1943 and delivered to the United Kingdom under the provisions of the Lend-Lease agreement (under which the United States of America supplied the United Kingdom and other Allied nations with materiel between 1941 and 1945). They were drawn from two classes of the American destroyer escort (originally "British Destroyer Escort") classification: 32 of the GMT (Evarts) Type and 46 of the TE (Buckley) Type. Upon reaching the UK the ships were substantially modified by the Royal Navy, making them distinct from the US Navy destroyer escort ships.

Captain-class frigates acted in the roles of convoy escorts, anti-submarine warfare vessels, coastal forces control frigates and headquarters ships for the Normandy landings. During the course of World War II this class participated in the sinking of at least 34 German submarines and a number of other hostile craft; 15 of the 78 Captain-class frigates were either sunk or written off as a constructive total loss.

In the post-war period, all of the surviving Captain-class frigates except one (HMS Hotham which was used as a power station and for powerplant experiments) were returned to the US Navy before the end of 1947 in order to reduce the amount payable under the provisions of the Lend-Lease agreement; the last Captain-class frigate was returned to United States custody in March 1956.

Naming

It was the intention of the Admiralty that these ships would be named after captains who served with Vice-Admiral Horatio Nelson at the Battle of Trafalgar, but as building continued it became necessary to delve back further into history for the names of well-regarded admirals and captains.

Of the 78 frigates, 66 bore names that had not been allocated to earlier Royal Navy ships. Lawford, Louis, Manners, Moorsom, Mounsey, Narborough, Pasley and Seymour had been used for destroyers during World War I.  was the fifth of that name since 1666. Torrington was the fourth of that name since 1654. Holmes had been used once before in 1671 and Fitzroy had previously been used for a survey vessel in 1919.

Early history

In June 1941 the British government, seeking to take advantage of the US Lend-Lease program, asked the United States to design, build and supply an escort vessel that was suitable for anti-submarine warfare in deep open ocean situations. The United States Navy had been looking into the feasibility of such a vessel since 1939, and Captain E. L. Cochrane of the US Navy's Bureau of Ships – who, during his visit to the United Kingdom in 1940, had looked at Royal Navy corvettes and s – had come up with a design for such a vessel. This design anticipated a need for large numbers of this type of vessel, and had sought to remove the major production bottleneck for such vessels: the double helical reduction gearing required for the steam turbine machinery of destroyers. The production of reduction gears could not be easily increased, as the precision machinery required for their construction alone took over a year to produce. Therefore, a readily-available and proven layout of diesel-electric machinery, also used on submarines, was adopted. When the United Kingdom made its request, Admiral Stark of the US Navy decided to put these plans into motion and recommended that the British order be approved. Gibbs and Cox, the marine architects charged with creating working plans, had to make several alterations to the production methods and to Captain Cochrane's original design, most notably dropping another production bottleneck – the 5-inch/38-caliber gun – and replacing it with the 3-inch/50-caliber gun, which allowed adding a superfiring third gun (at the "B" position, forward); also, the original design specified eight engines for  but other priority programs forced the use of only four with a consequent shortening of the hull and reduction of the ship's maximum speed by an estimated . The design had relatively light armour with for example the steel plate used on the Buckleys ranging from 1/2 inch to 7/16 inch with 1/4 inch plate being used for the majority of the hull and deck plating.

The result was a vessel that could be produced quickly (for example Halsted was built in just 24 and half days) at half the cost of a fleet destroyer, ($3.5 million compared to $10.4 million for a 1,620-ton destroyer such as the US  or $6.4 million for British Hunt-class destroyer.)

On 15 August 1941 President Franklin D. Roosevelt authorised the construction of 50 of the new Evarts-class design as BDE 1–50 (British destroyer escort) as part of the 1799 program. The turbo-electric powered Buckley class were not part of the first order and were authorised later by Public Law 440 effective 6 February 1942. The Royal Navy placed orders in November 1941 with four shipyards: the Boston Navy Yard, the Mare Island Navy Yard, the Philadelphia Naval Shipyard and the Puget Sound Navy Yard. When the United States entered the war, they too adopted the BDE design. The BDE designation was retained by the first six destroyer escorts (BDEs 1, 2, 3, 4, 12 and 46) transferred to the United Kingdom. Of the initial 50 ordered, these were the only ones the Royal Navy received; the rest were reclassified as destroyer escorts (DE) on 25 January 1943 and taken over by the United States Navy. By the end of World War II the Royal Navy had received 31 Evarts from Boston Navy Yard, 1 from Philadelphia Navy Yard and 46 Buckleys from Bethlehem-Hingham.

The Royal Navy classified these ships as frigates, as they lacked the torpedo tubes needed for a destroyer classification. For those used to Admiralty-designed ships the Captains were unfamiliar: they had no break forward of the forecastle but instead had a graceful shear to deck-line from the forecastle to midship, and the Evarts had raked cowls on top of the funnels. Those who served on these ships came to view these features as being very handsome. Amongst the differences with British-designed vessels were using bunks instead of hammocks and welds instead of rivets.

Propulsion
The Evarts subclass had diesel-electric machinery, based on an arrangement used for submarines. There were two shafts.

In order to make the designed speed, the Buckley subclass had turbo-electric machinery. Two Foster Wheeler Express "D"-type water-tube boilers supplied steam to GE  steam turbines and generators (9,200 kW). This all-electric drivetrain was considered particularly innovative at the time, although the s (known as Catherine class in RN) had a similar arrangement.

Royal Navy alterations
The first port of call in the United Kingdom for most of the Captain-class vessels was Pollock Dock, Belfast where the ships were modified in order to match Admiralty requirements. In all there were 109 items in the alterations and additions list for the Evarts and 94 for the Buckleys.

One major design difference between the Royal Navy Buckley-class frigates and the US Navy Buckley-class destroyer escorts was that the Royal Navy frigates did not mount torpedo tubes. (The Evarts class was not designed to carry torpedoes.)  The resulting reduction in top weight combined with the previous reduction in the gun battery resulted in excessive stability, causing sharp and violent rolling behaviour in the relatively short North Atlantic swells.  Several solutions were discussed including reshipping the torpedo tubes and replacing the American 3"/50 caliber guns with heavier British 4.5 inch but all proved impractical due to production bottlenecks and wartime congestion in British shipyards.  The problem was ultimately addressed by increasing the number of depth charges stowed on the upper deck and fitting larger bilge keels, which tamed the roll to manageable levels.

Further alterations were:

Sea-keeping equipment
A crow's nest was affixed to the mainmast. A standard Royal Navy  whaler was fitted on the port side of the funnel in addition to the US-issue ship's boat on the starboard side; additional Carley lifesaving rafts were also fitted: big ones on sloping launch skids aft of the funnel and small ones aft of the searchlights. Wind deflectors were fitted on the leading edge of the bridge area and a canvas-covered shelter was installed on the quarterdeck to provide better weather protection for depth charge crews. Oiling fairleads were fitted to the edge of the hull by the anchor winch. The bilge keels were lengthened and made deeper (a process that took a minimum of three weeks).

Gunnery

More 40 mm Bofors and Oerlikon 20 mm guns were mounted in place of the removed torpedo tubes, and the MK IV elevating column Oerlikon mountings were replaced with the simpler MK VIA mountings; those ships that were to serve as Coastal Forces control frigates hunting E-boats had extra guns fitted. On some ships, either gun shields were fitted to the main armament, or a spray and blast shield was fitted to the B gun. Two-inch rocket flare projectors were fitted to the B gun: six if the spray and blast shield was fitted, three if not. A 40 mm QF 2-pounder Mk VIII "pom-pom" was fitted as bowchaser to ships that were to serve as Coastal Forces control frigates.

The bridge layout was significantly altered; the biggest alteration was the addition of a two-tier director control tower that improved visibility and gave better protection to the equipment. Vertically fired "snowflake" parachute flare projectors were fitted to the bridge wings.

Anti-submarine
More depth charges were fitted on the upper deck of each side of the ship, allowing for about 200 in total; Royal Navy smoke floats were fitted above the depth charges in addition to the US Navy chemical smoke cylinders fitted to the stern of the Captains. A medium frequency direction finding antenna (MF/DF) was fitted in front of the bridge and a high-frequency direction finding (HF/DF, "Huffduff") Type FH 4 antenna was fitted on top of the mainmast; furthermore, a radio-receiving set tuned to the frequencies used for ship-to-ship communication by German U-boats and E-boats was fitted and a German-speaking rating carried. The Captains were eventually given Type 144 series Asdic (sonar) sets, an upgrade from the original Type 128D, and a Foxer was fitted to the aft of the Captains (and most other Atlantic escort vessels) during 1944 to counter the new G7es acoustic torpedoes.

Navigation and communications
The steel parts around the binnacle (the enclosure containing the compass) were replaced by non-ferrous materials. In addition to the standard US Navy long-range position-fixing set (LORAN), a Royal Navy GEE short-range position-fixing set was fitted. A radar interrogation system was installed that was able to challenge ships at sea (only ships likewise fitted with the system would be able to reply), along with four coloured fighting lights (signalling lamps installed on the yardarm to aid recognition by friendly forces during night fighting).

Camouflage and insignia
Following standard Royal Navy protocols, all of the Captains had large pennant numbers painted on the sides and stern of the hull, usually in blue, red or black. The escort groups to which most Captains were assigned had their own individual insignia; these distinctive and colourful designs were painted on the side of the ship's funnel, and if the ship was home to the escort group's senior officer it would also have a coloured band painted around the top of the funnel (usually in blue or red). The ship's waterline was always in black.

A total of five different ship camouflage schemes were employed on the Captains. The ships came from the shipyards in white with light blue polygons, the US Navy's camouflage pattern for northern latitudes. For those ships assigned to the North Atlantic, a scheme consisting of light and dark blues and greens with some soft white was adopted as it was believed that this would blend with the sea colour in bad weather. Ships assigned to the English Channel in 1944 (Coastal Forces control frigates and those assigned to Operation Neptune as headquarters ships) received a design in black, blue, light grey and white. For ships assigned to the 16th Flotilla (Harwich) and 21st Flotilla (Sheerness) operating in the North Sea and English Channel, a scheme consisting of horizontal upper deck divisions of light and dark grey (as used by the US Navy) was used. Early in 1945, a scheme was adopted that was to be common to all Royal Navy ships, consisting of white with a sky-blue stripe along the hull.

Modifications to Normandy landing HQ ships

	
HMS Dacres, HMS Kingsmill and HMS Lawford were converted to headquarters ships for use during Operation Neptune (the Normandy landings). These ships had their aft three-inch (76 mm) gun and all the depth charge gear removed, and the superstructure extended, to provide accommodations for extra Staff Officers; two deckhouses were built for the additional radios needed and a smaller extra mainmast was added to support the many additional aerials. Four more Oerlikons were fitted bringing the total to 16, and a number of radar sets fitted (Type 271 centimetric target identification and Type 291 air warning, and the associated Types 242 and 253 IFF sets). The complement was reduced to 141, but with a headquarters staff of 64.

Ships' companies
The Captains had a typical crew of either 156 (Evarts) or 186 (Buckley) officers and ratings. The bulk of the ratings enlisted after the outbreak of World War II, thus having little military or seafaring experience, and had to be trained in whichever branch of the Navy they chose to serve; after about six weeks drilling, marching and generally getting physically fit they went into specific job training. Many of the senior non-commissioned officers were pre-war Royal Navy ratings who had been promoted.

Engineering personnel were faced with the added complication of power plants not normally found in the Royal Navy. Initially, they were trained alongside US Navy personnel at purpose-built facilities in the General Electric Company factories at Cleveland and Syracuse, and were awarded certificates at the end of their training; later, training was provided in the United Kingdom.

On arriving in New York, the crews were initially assigned to  until they were reassigned to a Captain-class frigate. Later, some of the Captains were ferried across the Atlantic by crews of the Royal Canadian Navy coming to the United Kingdom to collect  frigates ordered by the Canadians.

Operations
These ships were primarily deployed to Escort Groups that were then used to provide anti-submarine cover to the convoys that they escorted. The four or more ships in an escort group, by operating together under a single commander, were able to use group tactics so that with the issue of a single short command the various ships of the group, often out of sight of each other, could be relied upon to act in a co-ordinated fashion.

A small number of Captains were converted to act as headquarters ships during Operation Neptune (the Normandy landings) and as coastal forces control frigates. Captains who operated with Coastal Forces (motor torpedo boats, motor gun boats and US Navy PT boats) sank at least two two-man submarines, and were involved in the destruction of at least 26 E-boats, one KFK patrol vessel (coastal escort vessels constructed so as to resemble a fishing-vessel), two minesweepers, and the shooting down of a Junkers Ju 88 aeroplane.

Collectively, the Captain class gained battle honours for service in Arctic (Russian) Convoys, Atlantic, Biscay, English Channel, Normandy (D-Day on 6 June 1944 and subsequent related operations), North Foreland and Walcheren. During the course of World War II they destroyed more German submarines than any other Royal Navy ship class.

Post-war
At the end of World War II, most of the surviving Captains were returned to the US Navy as quickly as possible to reduce the amount payable under the provisions of the Lend-Lease agreement. The last of the Captains returned was Hotham, which in the post-war period served as a floating power station in Singapore until early 1948, when she sailed for Portsmouth, becoming the base for a Royal Navy Engineering research team experimenting with gas turbine engines. Hotham was returned on 25 April 1952 and simultaneously transferred back to the United Kingdom under the Mutual Defence Assistance Program. The partially stripped vessel was returned to United States custody on 13 March 1956.

In film 
The rest of the film is set in the U-boat that it is hunting.  has a cameo in the final burial scene.

Memorial
On 17 April 2005 a memorial to the Captain class, those who served and those killed in action while serving in them was dedicated at the National Memorial Arboretum near Alrewas, Staffordshire.

See also
 Coastal Forces of the Royal Navy
 Colony-class frigate
 The Enemy Below (a 1957 war film partially filmed on a Buckley-class destroyer escort)
 List of destroyer escorts of the United States Navy
 List of frigate classes of the Royal Navy
  (the Destroyer Escort Historical Museum).
List of ship classes of World War II

References

Works cited

Further reading

External links

 http://www.desausa.org/ Destroyer Escort Sailors Association (DESA).
 https://web.archive.org/web/20070301070801/http://www.captainclassfrigates.co.uk/ the Captain Class Frigates Association.
 http://www.uboat.net uboat.net – Allied Warships – Captain class Frigates
 http://www.nationalmemorialarboretum.org/ The National Memorial Arboretum
 Convoy escort movements for Captain-class frigates

 
 
 
Frigate classes
Ship classes of the Royal Navy